The Employment Appeal Tribunal is a tribunal in England and Wales and Scotland, and is a superior court of record. Its primary role is to hear appeals from Employment Tribunals in England, Scotland and Wales. It also hears appeals from decisions of the Certification Officer and the Central Arbitration Committee and has original jurisdiction over certain industrial relations issues.

The tribunal may sit anywhere in Great Britain, although it is required to have an office in London. It is part of the UK tribunals system, under the administration of His Majesty's Courts and Tribunals Service. The tribunal may not make a declaration of incompatibility under the Human Rights Act 1998.

Membership
There are two classes of members of the tribunal:
Nominated members, who are appointed from English and Welsh circuit judges, judges of the High Court and the Court of Appeal as well as at least one judge from the Court of Session.
Appointed members, who must have special knowledge or experience of industrial relations, appointed either as representatives of:
Employers; or
Workers.

Members are nominated or appointed by the Lord Chief Justice. One of the nominated judges is selected as the president. The usual term of office for president is three years. Since 1 January 2019, the president has been Sir Akhlaq Choudhury.

Procedure
The tribunal is governed by the Employment Appeal Tribunal Rules 1993, as amended in 1996, 2001, 2004 and 2005, and further by its Practice Direction. Parties are expected to understand and apply these rules.

Jurisdiction
The tribunal has jurisdiction to consider appeals only on questions of law, including perversity.

Appeals from the Employment Appeals Tribunal
A party dissatisfied with a decision of the Employment Appeal Tribunal may apply to the tribunal requesting a review of its own decision. The tribunal may also review its decision of its own motion. Decisions can be reviewed where an error is relatively minor, for example a clerical error. Where a party believes the tribunal has misapplied the law or acted perversely, the review process is inappropriate and the party may appeal to the Court of Appeal (England and Wales) or the Court of Session (Scotland).

Parties are expected to comply with strictly enforced time limits when applying for a review or appeal.

History
The Employment Appeal Tribunal was created in 1975 as a successor to the National Industrial Relations Court, which had been abolished in 1974.

Presidents of the Employment Appeal Tribunal
1976 to 1978 – Sir Raymond Phillips
1978 to 1981 – Sir Gordon Slynn
1981 to 1983 – Sir Nicolas Browne-Wilkinson
1983 to 1985 – Sir John Waite
1986 to 1988 – Sir Oliver Popplewell
1988 to 1993 – Sir John Wood
1993 to 1996 – Sir John Mummery
1996 to 1999 – Sir Thomas Morison
1999 to 2002 – Sir John Lindsay
2002 to 2005 – Sir Michael Burton
2006 to 2008 – Sir Patrick Elias
2009 to 2011 – Sir Nicholas Underhill
2012 to 2015 – Sir Brian Langstaff
2016 to 2018 – Dame Ingrid Simler
2019 to 2022 – Sir Akhlaq Choudhury
2022 to present – Dame Jennifer Eady

Offices
The tribunal has two permanent offices: for England and Wales it is located at Fleetbank House, Salisbury Square, in the Fleet Street area of London; for Scotland it is located at George House, 126 George Street in Edinburgh.

References

External links

Labour relations in the United Kingdom
1975 establishments in the United Kingdom
Ministry of Justice (United Kingdom)
United Kingdom tribunals
Organisations based in the City of London